Benjamim Dornelles Vargas  (October 27, 1897March 26, 1973), also known as Bejo, was a Brazilian politician. In 1934 he was constituent deputy of the Republican Party of Rio Grande do Sul (PRR).

He was the brother of Getúlio Vargas.

References 

Republican Party of Rio Grande do Sul politicians
1897 births
1973 deaths
People from São Borja
Benjamim
Brazilian military personnel